Jamie Linden (born September 3, 1980) is an American screenwriter best known for We Are Marshall (2006) and Dear John (2010). He also wrote and directed 10 Years (2011) starring Channing Tatum.

Early life
Linden grew up in Winter Park, Florida near Orlando, where he attended Lake Howell High School. He attended Florida State University's College of Communication, majoring in marketing and media production. After graduating from college in 2001, he and three friends traveled to Hollywood, California with tickets for game show The Price Is Right. Upon arriving, he was individually called up to compete and won US$5,000 and a Tuscan wine server cart, which he saw as a sign to stay in Hollywood: "I thought, well that's a sign, 'I should stay.' What you want to do, finds you."

Career
Before Linden became a screenwriter, he worked at Mirage Enterprises as an assistant to directors Sydney Pollack and Anthony Minghella. After reading in a 30th anniversary article in FSView & Florida Flambeau, Florida State's student newspaper, about the 1970 Southern Airways Flight 932 plane crash that killed most of the Marshall University Thundering Herd football team, Linden says he became "obsessed" with the story. After moving to Hollywood, his first job involved reading feature film screenplays. After being fired from several assistant positions, he decided to write his own screenplay. His first script was titled Things to Do Before I Die, co-written with University of Florida alumnus Cory Helms, and Warner Bros. gave the pair a blind deal to write another script. Linden says the aftermath of the Marshall University tragedy was the very first story he ever thought of. In 2004, he pitched the story to Warner Bros. with film producers Basil Iwanyk and Mary Viola. When Warner Bros. bought the script, Linden and other film crew met with many family members of the plane crash victims including Keith Morehouse, whose father was killed in the crash, to collaborate on the honesty of the script and the dignity of the victims. The film became We Are Marshall, released in 2006 and directed by McG (Joseph McGinty Nichol), founder of Wonderland Sound and Vision.

In 2006, it was reported that Linden was writing a biographical film about Olympic gold medalist downhill skier Bill Johnson to be produced by Basil Iwanyk, as well as an adaptation of The Dogs of Babel to be produced by David Heyman and a television pilot titled Flash Back to be directed by McG.

Personal life
In April 2013, Linden was a groomsman at the wedding of Friday Night Lights actor Scott Porter. They were classmates at Lake Howell High School in Winter Park, Florida.

In 2016, Linden started dating Canadian actress Rachel McAdams. Their first child, a son, was born in April 2018.  In August 2020, it was reported that they were expecting their second child. During an interview in May 2022, McAdams confirmed she had given birth to a daughter.

Filmography

References

External links

1980 births
American male screenwriters
Living people
Florida State University alumni
Place of birth missing (living people)
Writers from Orlando, Florida
People from Winter Park, Florida
Film directors from Florida
American expatriates in Canada
Screenwriters from Florida
Film producers from Florida
21st-century American screenwriters
21st-century American male writers